Douglas "Doug" McCarthy is an English retired professional darts player who played members in the British Darts Organisation 1970s and 1980s.

Career

McCarthy played in four BDO World Darts Championships. In 1979, he beat Charlie Ellix in the first round but lost in round two to John Lowe. In 1980, McCarthy beat Conrad Daniels in round one before losing to Jocky Wilson in the second round.  In 1981, McCarthy lost in the first round to Ceri Morgan and 1982 he beat Jerry Umberger in round one but lost in round two to Bobby George. McCarthy also played in four World Masters tournaments but failed to reach the quarter final stage.

McCarthy also represented England on 19 occasions and was a member of the England Team including Eric Bristow and John Lowe which won the Europe Cup in 1978.

Almost 20 years after his last televised appearance, McCarthy qualified the PDC World Grand Prix in Ireland but lost in the first round to former World Champion Richie Burnett. McCarthy is still active in the game, most recently playing in the 2008 Isle of Man Open and still playing Super League darts in County Durham.

World Championship Results

BDO

 1979: 2nd Round (lost to John Lowe 0–2) (sets) 
 1980: 2nd Round (lost to Jocky Wilson 0–2)
 1981: 1st Round (lost to Ceri Morgan 1–2)
 1982: 2nd Round (lost to Bobby George 1–2)

External links
Profile and stats on Darts Database

English darts players
Living people
British Darts Organisation players
Professional Darts Corporation associate players
1943 births